Kourwéogo is one of the 45 provinces of Burkina Faso, located in its Plateau-Central Region. It has a population of 181,202 (2019 census).

Its capital is Boussé.

Departments
Kourweogo is divided into 5 departments:

See also
Regions of Burkina Faso
Provinces of Burkina Faso
Departments of Burkina Faso

References

 
Provinces of Burkina Faso